Algerian Canadians are Canadian citizens of Algerian ancestry or Algeria-born people residing in Canada, as well as people from the state of Algeria who are ethno-linguistic and religious minorities. According to the 2011 Census there were 49,110 Canadians who claimed full or partial Algerian ancestry. Canada is home to the largest Algerian community in North America.

Between 2004 and 2013, 42,252 permanent residents moved to Canada from Algeria.

Notable Algerian Canadians 
 Rabah Aït Ouyahia, actor
 Boualem Khouider, climate scientist
 Zachary Lagha, ice dancer
 Lynda Thalie, singer-songwriter
 Zaho, singer

See also 
Moroccan Canadians
Tunisian Canadians
Arab Canadians
Berbers in Canada
Algeria–Canada relations
Middle Eastern Canadians

References 

Arab Canadian
Algerian emigrants to Canada
Canada
Algerian
African Canadian